This is a list of songs recorded by American rapper Kendrick Lamar. As of July 2022, Lamar has recorded 82 songs.

Songs

Notes

References

Lamar, Kendrick
Kendrick Lamar